Side Line is the fourth studio album by the Japanese pop group Onyanko Club. It was released on February 21, 1987, through Canyon Records in LP and CD format. It peaked at number one on the Oricon charts and sold a total of 69,000 copies.

Overview 
This is the first Onyanko Club album to not contain any single A-sides. However, the B-side for "NO MORE Ren'aigokko", "Anata dake Oyasuminasai", was included. It is also the first album to feature numbers 38, 40, 41, 42, and 47, the first and last to feature numbers 43 through 46, and the last to feature numbers 6, 8, 13, 15 & 16 until the next album, Circle, was released. (Two members were not in Circle.)

Participating members 

 Aki Kihara (#6)
 Sayuri Kokushō (#8)
 Kazuko Utsumi (#13)
 Harumi Tomikawa (#14)
 Rika Tatsumi (singer) (#15)
 Mamiko Takai (#16)
 Sanae Jōnouchi (#17)
 Ruriko Nagata (#18)
 Yukiko Iwai (#19)
 Mako Shiraishi (#22)
 Mutsumi Yokota (#28)
 Minayo Watanabe (#29)
 Tomoko Fukawa (#33)
 Marina Watanabe (#36)
 Shizuka Kudō (#38)
 Akiko Ikuina (#40)
 Noriko Kaise (#41)
 Makiko Saitō (#42)
 Toshie Moriya (#43)
 Naoko Takada (#44)
 Yumiko Yoshida (#45)
 Sanae Nakajima (#46)
 Yuriko Yamamori (#47)

Track listings 
All songs written by Yasushi Akimoto, except "Shin Shin Kaiin Bangō no Uta" written by Satsuo Endō.

LP version

CD version

Personnel 
 Fumio Miyata – recording coordinator
 Hiroshi Saisu – recording engineer
 Tatsuya Sawada – recording engineer, remixing engineer
 Keizoh Suzuki – recording engineer
 Hiroshi Watanabe – recording director
 Kazuya Yoshida – recording engineer, remixing engineer

Onyanko Club albums
1987 albums
Japanese-language albums